SpudBAR is an Australian baked potato chain, founded in 2000 in Fitzroy, Victoria. SpudBAR is the largest Australian owned potato franchise with locations in Victoria, Western Australia and Queensland.

SpurBAR currently has 21 active locations across Australia. Its ventures in Western Australia (at Cannington, Fremantle and Joondalup) were unsuccessful, with each of these stores going out of business.

Menu 
SpudBAR offers a variety of pre-set menu options as well as a create your own option.

SpudBAR's menus is made up of three major sections:
 Spuds
 Salads
 Snacks
SpudBAR offers a variety of different spud, salad and snack options depending on customers dietary options. These include;
 Vegetarian (v)
 Dairy free (df)
 Vegan  (vg)

See also
 List of restaurant chains in Australia
 List of hamburger restaurants

References

External links

Fast-food chains of Australia
Fast-food hamburger restaurants
Australian companies established in 2000
Restaurants established in 2000
2000 establishments in Australia